The Chetham Society "for the publication of remains historic and literary connected with the Palatine Counties of Lancaster and Chester" is a text publication society and registered charity (No. 700047) established on 23 March 1843.

History
The Chetham Society is the oldest historical society in North West England. It was founded by a group of gentlemen (including the lawyer James Crossley and the clergymen Thomas Corser, Richard Parkinson, and Francis Robert Raines), who wished to promote interest in the counties' historical sources. The society held its foundation meeting on 23 March 1843 at Chetham's Library, in Manchester, which was established in 1653 by the will of the philanthropist Humphrey Chetham. The society became a registered charity (No. 700047) in 1988. 

The Chetham Society was amongst the earliest antiquarian and historical societies to be established in Britain during the nineteenth century, and appears to have been modelled, in part, on the Durham-based Surtees Society founded in 1834.

During its early years, the society enjoyed the support of patrons such as the Prime Minister of the day Sir Robert Peel, the Bishop of Chester, the Earls of Balcarres, Burlington, and Derby, Lord Stanley of Bickerstaffe, Lord Francis Egerton, as well as several other peers and MPs who became members.

Many distinguished historians and scholars have been involved in the life of the society, including John Eglington Bailey, C. R. Cheney, John Parsons Earwaker, Edward Hawkins, Sir Henry Hoyle Howorth, George Ormerod, Sir Frederick Maurice Powicke, William Stubbs, Thomas Frederick Tout, J. M. Wallace-Hadrill, and Joseph Brooks Yates, amongst many others.

Membership
Membership of the Chetham Society is open to all individuals and institutions interested in the various historical and literary aspects of Lancashire and Cheshire.

Publications
Since 1843, the society has published nearly 280 volumes in three series, supplying a regular output of valuable works of scholarship relating to the study of the history of North-West England.

Old Series (1843–93)

The Old Series (O.S.) ran from 1843 until 1893 (totalling 116 volumes). Publications included Pott's Discovery of Witches, Civil War Tracts, and various diaries, journals, autobiographies, correspondence, heralds' visitations, family deeds, papers, letters, and accounts, school registers and records, wills, and ecclesiastical and parish histories.

New Series (1883–1947)

The New Series (N.S.) commenced in 1883 and ended in 1947 (totalling 110 volumes). Publications covered a diversity of areas and topics, including charters, cartularies, rolls, rentals, surveys, autobiographical writings, biographies, genealogies, and various parish, town, and local histories.

Third Series (1948–present)

The Third Series (T.S.) began in 1948 (volume 53 was published in 2019). In recent years (particularly since the inauguration of the Third Series), the society's focus has tended to move away from its traditional role of publishing original primary texts towards publishing scholarly secondary analyses. Recent volumes have included:

Officers

Presidents

Vice-presidents

General editors

Secretaries

Treasurers

See also
Chetham's Library
Historic Society of Lancashire and Cheshire
Record Society of Lancashire and Cheshire
Lancashire and Cheshire Antiquarian Society
Lancashire Parish Register Society
List of societies for education in Manchester

References

Citations

Bibliography

Further reading

External links
Chetham Society Website
Archives Hub: Chetham Society Archive
Chetham's Library
Royal Historical Society: List of Chetham Society Publications

 
Organisations based in Manchester
Charities based in Manchester
Historical societies of the United Kingdom
Text publication societies
1843 establishments in England
1843 establishments in the United Kingdom
Organizations established in 1843
History organisations based in the United Kingdom
Heritage organisations in England
Regional and local learned societies of the United Kingdom
History of literature in England
History of Lancashire
History of Cheshire
Culture in Lancashire
Culture in Cheshire